Eri Hozumi and Miyu Kato were the defending champions and successfully defended their title, defeating Katy Dunne and Julia Glushko in the final, 6–4, 6–2.

Seeds

Draw

References
Main Draw

Kangaroo Cup - Doubles
2017 in Japanese tennis
Kangaroo Cup